Protein S100-A4 (S100A4) is a protein that in humans is encoded by the S100A4 gene.

Function 

The protein encoded by this gene is a member of the S100 family of proteins containing 2 EF-hand calcium-binding motifs. S100 proteins are localized in the cytoplasm and/or nucleus of a wide range of cells, and involved in the regulation of a number of cellular processes such as cell cycle progression and differentiation. S100 genes include at least 13 members which are located as a cluster on chromosome 1q21. This protein may function in motility, invasion, and tubulin polymerization. Chromosomal rearrangements and altered expression of this gene have been implicated in tumor metastasis. Multiple alternatively spliced variants, encoding the same protein, have been identified.

Interactions 

S100A4 has been shown to interact with S100 calcium binding protein A1.

Therapeutic targeting for cancer 
S100A4, a member of the S100 calcium-binding protein family secreted by tumor and stromal cells, supports tumorigenesis by stimulating angiogenesis. Research demonstrated that S100A4 synergizes with vascular endothelial growth factor (VEGF), via the RAGE receptor, in promoting endothelial cell migration by increasing KDR expression and MMP-9 activity. In vivo overexpression of S100A4 led to a significant increase in tumor growth and vascularization in a human melanoma xenograft M21 model. Conversely, when silencing S100A4 by shRNA technology, a dramatic decrease in tumor development of the pancreatic MIA PaCa-2 cell line was observed. Based on these results 5C3 was developed, a neutralizing monoclonal antibody against S100A4. This antibody abolished endothelial cell migration, tumor growth and angiogenesis in immunodeficient mouse xenograft models of MiaPACA-2 and M21-S100A4 cells. It is concluded that extracellular S100A4 inhibition is an attractive approach for the treatment of human cancer.

S100A4 is highly associated with components of the cytoskeleton and when this gene is upregulated, it changes the cell’s morphology, making it more susceptible to invasion from proteins, such as cathepsin B and cyclin B1, that contribute to metastasis. Together, these factors form polyploid giant cancer cells (PGCCs), which are highly proliferative and invasive. Experimental knockout therapy data have suggested that S100A4 exhibits a form of control over cathepsin B and cyclin B1, and that suppressing it can reduce the invasive capabilities of PGCCs and their daughter cells. Studies on invasive breast cancer have found that S100A4 plays a major role in high-density collagen deposition, which is one of the clinical symptoms of tumor metastasis. Significantly higher levels of S100A4 were found in samples that exhibited lymph node metastasis than in those that didn’t, indicating that abnormal collagen deposition could be contributed to by S100A4. Not only does overexpression of S100A4 contribute to the formation of various cancers, but it also contributes to pathological factors associated with cancer and its progression.

References

Further reading

External links 
 

S100 proteins